Oneida is a genus of snout moths. It was described by George Duryea Hulst in 1889.

Species
 Oneida grisiella
 Oneida luniferella Hulst, 1895
 Oneida lunulalis Hulst, 1887
 Oneida marmorata
 Oneida mejona Schaus, 1922

References

Epipaschiinae
Pyralidae genera
Taxa named by George Duryea Hulst